Wagner is an unincorporated area and village in Phillips County, Montana, United States. The town lies along the Hi-Line of the Great Northern Railway.

Notes

Unincorporated communities in Phillips County, Montana
Unincorporated communities in Montana
Ghost towns in Montana